E.J. and E. Griffith Interlocking Tower is a historic interlocking tower located at Griffith, Lake County, Indiana. It was built in 1924 by the Elgin, Joliet and Eastern Railway.  It is a three-story, brick building measuring 25 feet long, 16 feet wide, and 30 feet tall. It has a concrete foundation and low pitched hipped roof. The depot operated until 1999.  It was moved to its present location in the Griffith Historical Park and Railroad Museum in 2000.

It was listed in the National Register of Historic Places in 2003.

References

External links
Griffith Historical Society website

History museums in Indiana
Railway buildings and structures on the National Register of Historic Places in Indiana
Buildings and structures completed in 1924
Buildings and structures in Lake County, Indiana
National Register of Historic Places in Lake County, Indiana
Railway buildings and structures on the National Register of Historic Places
Industrial buildings and structures on the National Register of Historic Places in Indiana
1924 establishments in Indiana